The 2011–12 UCI Africa Tour was the eighth season of the UCI Africa Tour. The season began on 29 September 2011 with the Grand Prix Chantal Biya and ended on 11 June 2012 with the Kwita Izina Cycling Tour.

The points leader, based on the cumulative results of previous races, wears the UCI Africa Tour cycling jersey. Adil Jelloul of Morocco was the defending champion of the 2010–11 UCI Africa Tour. Tarik Chaoufi of Morocco was crowned as the 2011–12 UCI Africa Tour champion.

Throughout the season, points are awarded to the top finishers of stages within stage races and the final general classification standings of each of the stages races and one-day events. The quality and complexity of a race also determines how many points are awarded to the top finishers, the higher the UCI rating of a race, the more points are awarded.
The UCI ratings from highest to lowest are as follows:
 Multi-day events: 2.HC, 2.1 and 2.2
 One-day events: 1.HC, 1.1 and 1.2

Events

2011

2012

Final standings

Individual classification

Team classification

Nation classification

Nation under-23 classification

External links
 

UCI Africa Tour
2012 in road cycling
2011 in road cycling
2012 in African sport
2011 in African sport